The 2013 World Mixed Doubles Curling Championship was held from April 13 to 20 at the newly constructed Grant-Harvey Centre in Fredericton, New Brunswick. The event was held in conjunction with the 2013 World Senior Curling Championships. This event marked the first time that Canada has hosted a World Mixed Doubles Curling Championship since its inception in 2008.

Teams
The teams are listed as follows:

Round robin standings
Final Round Robin Standings

Round robin results

Grey Pool

Saturday, April 13
Draw 1
9:00

Draw 4
20:00

Sunday, April 14
Draw 7
14:30

Monday, April 15
Draw 10
9:00

Draw 13
19:30

Tuesday, April 16
Draw 16
14:30

Wednesday, April 17
Draw 19
9:00

Draw 22
19:30

Thursday, April 18
Draw 25
14:30

Yellow Pool

Saturday, April 13
Draw 2
12:30

Sunday, April 14
Draw 5
8:00

Draw 8
17:45

Monday, April 15
Draw 11
12:30

Tuesday, April 16
Draw 14
8:00

Draw 17
17:45

Wednesday, April 17
Draw 20
12:30

Thursday, April 18
Draw 23
8:00

Draw 26
17:45

Blue Pool

Saturday, April 13
Draw 3
16:30

Sunday, April 14
Draw 6
11:15

Draw 9
21:00

Monday, April 15
Draw 12
16:00

Tuesday, April 16
Draw 15
11:15

Draw 18
21:00

Wednesday, April 17
Draw 21
16:00

Thursday, April 18
Draw 24
11:15

Draw 27
21:00

Tiebreaker
Friday, April 19, 9:00

Playoffs

Qualification Game
Friday, April 19, 13:30

Quarterfinals
Friday, April 19, 18:00

Semifinals
Saturday, April 20, 11:00

Bronze medal game
Saturday, April 20, 17:00

Gold medal game
Saturday, April 20, 17:00

References
General

Specific

External links

World Mixed Doubles Curling Championship, 2013
World Mixed Doubles Curling Championship
2013 in Canadian curling
Curling competitions in Fredericton
International curling competitions hosted by Canada
World Mixed Doubles Curling Championship